Palunku Pathram is a 1970 Indian Malayalam-language film directed by M. Krishnan Nair and produced by A. L. Sreenivasan. The film stars Prem Nazir, Sathyan, Padmini and Sukumari. The film had musical score by G. Devarajan. It is a remake of the Tamil film Kai Kodutha Deivam.

Plot

Cast 

Prem Nazir
Sathyan
Padmini
Sukumari
Jayabharathi
Kaviyoor Ponnamma
Adoor Bhasi
Muthukulam Raghavan Pillai
T. S. Muthaiah
Baby Rajani
K. P. Ummer
Ushakumari
Mythili

Soundtrack 
The music was composed by G. Devarajan with lyrics by Vayalar Ramavarma.

References

External links 
 

1970 films
1970s Malayalam-language films
Films directed by M. Krishnan Nair
Malayalam remakes of Tamil films